Hélio José (born March 9, 1960) is a Brazilian politician. He has represented Distrito Federal in the Federal Senate since 2015. He is a member of the Brazilian Democratic Movement Party.

References

Living people
1960 births
Brazilian Democratic Movement politicians
Members of the Federal Senate (Brazil)